The 1984 World Field Archery Championships were held in Hyvinkää, Finland.

Medal summary (Men's individual)

Medal summary (Women's individual)

Medal summary (team events)
No team event held at this championships.

References

E
1984 in Finnish sport
International archery competitions hosted by Finland
World Field Archery Championships